Bogdan Iadov (born 27 November 1996) is a Ukrainian  judoka.

Winner of the Europe Championship in Sofia at 2022.

He is the silver medallist of the 2019 Judo Grand Slam Baku in the -66 kg category.

At the 2021 Judo Grand Slam Abu Dhabi held in Abu Dhabi, United Arab Emirates, he won one of the bronze medals in his event. In 2022, he won one of the bronze medals in his event at the 2022 Judo Grand Prix Almada held in Almada, Portugal. He won one of the bronze medals in his event at the 2022 Judo Grand Slam Tel Aviv held in Tel Aviv, Israel.

References

External links
 
 
 

1996 births
Living people
Ukrainian male judoka
Judoka at the 2014 Summer Youth Olympics
Universiade medalists in judo
Universiade bronze medalists for Ukraine
Medalists at the 2015 Summer Universiade
European Games competitors for Ukraine
Judoka at the 2015 European Games
Judoka at the 2019 European Games
21st-century Ukrainian people